Council is an unincorporated community in Clinch County, in the U.S. state of Georgia.

History
A post office called Council was established in 1909, and remained in operation until 1958. The community was named after C. C. and John M. Council, proprietors of a local sawmill.

References

Unincorporated communities in Clinch County, Georgia